Owusu Achaw Duah is a Ghanaian medical doctor and  politician. He is the CEO and president of Martin Luther King Health Training School. In 2006, he was elected as the member of parliament for the  Offinso South constituency through a by-election following the death of Kwabena Sarfo in August 2006.

Education 
Owusu had his ordinary and advanced level certificates from Konongo Odumase Senior High and Opoku Ware Senior High schools respectively. He graduated from the University of Ghana Medical School in 1973 and also holds a post-graduate diploma in Telemedicine.

Politics 
Owusu contested and won the Offinso South constituency by-election in 2006 on the ticket of the New patriotic Party.

Career 
He is a medical director at Dr Martin Luther King Clinic in Accra and an external examiner at the Kwame Nkrumah University of Science and Technology. He is a retired lecturer and former Head of Chemical Pathology Department of University of Ghana Medical School.

Personal life 
Owusu is married with 5 children.

References

Living people
Ghanaian MPs 2005–2009
New Patriotic Party politicians
University of Ghana Medical School alumni
Ghanaian pathologists
People from Ashanti Region
Year of birth missing (living people)
Konongo Odumase Senior High School alumni
Alumni of Opoku Ware School